The 9th South American Youth Championships in Athletics were held in Cuenca, Ecuador, from September 2–4, 1988.

Medal summary
Medal winners are published for boys and girls. Complete results can be found on the "World Junior Athletics History" website.

All results are marked as "affected by altitude" (A), because Cuenca is located at 2,560 metres above sea level.

Men

Women

Medal table (unofficial)

Participation (unofficial)
Detailed result lists can be found on the "World Junior Athletics History" website.  An unofficial count yields the number of about 190 athletes from about 9 countries: 

 (11)
 (9)
 (50)
 (23)
 (17)
 (49)
 (6)
 Perú (24)
 (1)

References

External links
World Junior Athletics History

South American U18 Championships in Athletics
South American Youth Championships
South American U18 Championships|South American Youth Championships
International athletics competitions hosted by Ecuador